Mariya Valeriyivna Rud (born 25 November 1992) is a Ukrainian badminton player.

Achievements

BWF International Challenge/Series 
Women's doubles

  BWF International Challenge tournament.
  BWF International Series tournament.
  BWF Future Series tournament.

References

External links 
 

Living people
1992 births
Ukrainian female badminton players
21st-century Ukrainian women